Hendrickson Peak is a rock peak rising over  at the west side of Reedy Glacier, standing  west of May Peak in the Quartz Hills of Antarctica. It was mapped by the United States Geological Survey from surveys and U.S. Navy air photos, 1960–64, and was named by the Advisory Committee on Antarctic Names for George Hendrickson, a glaciologist at Byrd Station in 1962–63 and 1963–64.

References

Mountains of Marie Byrd Land